Wadi-Wadi is an extinct Indigenous Australian language once spoken in New South Wales.

Clark suggests that Jari Jari is a closely related language, but this name may refer to other languages.

References

Kulin languages
Extinct languages of New South Wales